Sau Mau Ping is a proposed MTR station on the proposed . It will be located at Sau Mau Ping, Kwun Tong District, Kowloon, Hong Kong. The station is still under planning.

References

Sau Mau Ping
Proposed railway stations in Hong Kong
MTR stations in Kowloon